Antispila argostoma is a moth of the  family Heliozelidae. It was described by Edward Meyrick in 1916. It is found in India.

The larvae feed on Cayratia trifolia.

References

Moths described in 1916
Heliozelidae